The following lists events that happened during 1823 in Australia.

Incumbents
Monarch – George IV

Governors
Governors of the Australian colonies:
Governor of New South Wales – Major-General Sir Thomas Brisbane
Lieutenant-Governor of Tasmania – Colonel William Sorell

Events
 The British Government, with the New South Wales Judicature Act, establishes the first Legislative Council in Australia, an advisory body of five appointed citizens. The Governor, Thomas Brisbane, has power of veto.
 15 February – Surveyor James McBrien at the Fish River near Bathurst discovers gold. It is the first known report of gold, though it is not made public, the Australian gold rushes do not begin until 1851.
 11 December – Richmond Bridge, the oldest bridge in Australia still in use, had its foundation stone laid.

Exploration and settlement
 5 June – A path through the Liverpool Range, now known as Pandora's Pass, is found by Allan Cunningham.
 31 October – John Oxley explores the Tweed River.
 2 December – John Oxley become the first European to navigate the Brisbane River.

Arts and literature
 William Charles Wentworth publishes the first book of Australian verse, Australasia: A Poem, in London.

Births
 Unknown – Frank McCallum, bushranger (born in the United Kingdom) (d. 1857)

Deaths
 5 January – George Johnston (b. 1764), marine and Lieutenant-Governor of New South Wales
 7 November – Thomas Laycock (b. 1786), explorer

References

 
Australia
Years of the 19th century in Australia